Alberto Alemán Zubieta (born c. 1951) is a former administrator of the Panama Canal. He graduated from Texas A&M University in civil and industrial engineering in 1973. He lives in Panama with his wife, Ana Matilde, and their three children.

Awards 
 "William Ross Medal", presented in 1992 by the Panamanian Chamber of Construction (CAPAC)
 "Honorary Fellow" in 1997 and "Federal Engineer of the Year Award" from the American Society of Civil Engineers
 "Florencio Icaza Award" bestowed by the Association of Panamanian Architects and Engineers (SPIA)
 "Maritime Personality 2001" Award, presented by Seatrade
 "The Business man of the Year 2002" from the Panamanian Business Executives Association (APEDE)
 "Outstanding International Alumnus Award of Texas A&M University" awarded in December 2003

References

External links
 Panama Canal Authority
 Biography (from Panama Canal Authority)
 "Interview with Alberto Aleman-Zubieta, the Administrator and CEO of the Panama Canal Authority", App2US
 "Martín's blank check for improper contracts", Panama News, July 9 - 22, 2006

Panama Canal
Panamanian businesspeople
Texas A&M University alumni
1950s births
Living people